Ryan Gardner (born 1 June 1997) is a professional Australian rules footballer who plays for the  in the Australian Football League (AFL). Gardner was initially drafted by Geelong at pick 59 in the 2015 AFL draft, but was delisted at the end of the 2018 AFL season without having played a senior game. However, Gardner was recruited by the Western Bulldogs in the 2019 mid-season rookie draft and made his debut on 2 June 2019.

Before being drafted by Geelong, Gardner played for the Burnie Dockers Football Club.

Gardner injured his AC joint in his shoulder in the opening minutes of Round 3, keeping him out of the team for an estimated 10 weeks.

Statistics
 Statistics are correct to the end of the 2020 season

|-
|-
! scope="row" style="text-align:center" | 2019
|style="text-align:center;"|
| 43 || 2 || 2 || 1 || 4 || 8 || 12 || 2 || 1 || 1.0 || 0.5 || 2.0 || 4.0 || 6.0 || 1.0 || 0.5
|-style="background-color: #EAEAEA"
! scope="row" style="text-align:center" | 2020
|style="text-align:center;"|
| 43 || 10 || 0 || 0 || 41 || 35 || 76 || 27 || 13 || 0.0 || 0.0 || 4.1 || 3.5 || 7.6 || 2.7 || 1.3
|-
! scope="row" style="text-align:center" | 2021
|style="text-align:center;"|
| 43 || 3 || 0 || 0 || 15 || 6 || 21 || 11 || 2 || 0.0 || 0.0 || 5.0 || 2.0 || 7.0 || 3.7 || 0.7
|- class="sortbottom"
! colspan=3| Career
! 15
! 2
! 1
! 60
! 49
! 109
! 40
! 16
! 0.1
! 0.1
! 4.0
! 3.3
! 7.3
! 2.7
! 1.1
|}

Notes

References

External links

1997 births
Living people
Geelong Football Club players
Western Bulldogs players
Australian rules footballers from Tasmania
Burnie Dockers Football Club players